The Arizona Tennis Classic is a professional tennis tournament played on hard courts. It is currently part of the ATP Challenger Tour. It is held annually in Phoenix, Arizona, United States since 2019.

Past finals

Singles

Doubles

References

External links
Official website

ATP Challenger Tour
Hard court tennis tournaments in the United States
Tennis tournaments in Arizona
Sports competitions in Phoenix, Arizona
Recurring sporting events established in 2019